Franciscus Patricius (1529–1597) was a philosopher from Dalmatia.

Francesco Patrizi may also refer to:

 (1266–1328), priest from Siena
Francesco Patrizi (bishop) (1413–1492), humanist from Siena